Bessborough Armoury is a Canadian Forces armoury located at 2025 West 11th Avenue in Vancouver, British Columbia.

History 

Construction of the armoury began in September 1932 and was completed in the following spring.

Architecture
The architect was Richard T. Perry, who was also the Commanding Officer of the 15th Brigade. The outside of the building was done in an Art Deco style. Once the building was completed it initially provided accommodations for 15th Brigade and the British Columbia Hussars. The building was officially opened on 27 March 1934 by the Earl of Bessborough, the Governor-General of Canada.

The building is listed on the Vancouver Inventory of heritage buildings as a "B" Category and is classed as a "Registered" building by the Federal Heritage Buildings Review Office.

Houses
In the Canadian Forces, an armoury is a place where a reserve unit trains, meets, and parades.
 15th Field Artillery Regiment, RCA
 2472 (15th Field Regiment, RCA) Royal Canadian Army Cadet Corps
 111 (Pegasus), Royal Canadian Air Cadet Squadron

See also
List of Armouries in Canada

References

Media
Regimental History: 15th Field Artillery Regiment, Royal Regiment of Canadian Artillery
Vancouver's Bessborough Armoury: A History by Robert V. Stevenson (Jan 2010)

External links
"2003 Top Ten Endangered Sites" Heritage Vancouver.

 

Buildings and structures in Vancouver
Armouries in Canada
Military of Canada
Heritage sites in British Columbia